Zamba may refer to:

 Zamba (artform), a style of music and dance
 Zamba (mythology), a creator-god
 Zamba (name)
 Zamba (film), a 1949 film directed by William Berke
 Zamba language, a Bantu language